Eucaerus is a genus of beetles in the family Carabidae

containing the following species:

 Eucaerus badistrinus (Bates, 1872) 
 Eucaerus geminatus Bates, 1871 
 Eucaerus haitianus Darlington, 1935 
 Eucaerus hilaris Bates, 1871 
 Eucaerus insularis Darlington, 1934 
 Eucaerus lebioides Bates, 1871 
 Eucaerus olisthopoides Bates, 1872 
 Eucaerus opacicollis (Bates, 1872) 
 Eucaerus pulchripennis Bates, 1871 
 Eucaerus sericatus Ball & Hilchie, 1983 
 Eucaerus sericeus Bates, 1871 
 Eucaerus striatus Bates, 1871 
 Eucaerus sublimbatus Motschulsky, 1862 
 Eucaerus sulcatus Bates, 1871 
 Eucaerus varicornis Leconte, 1853

References

Lebiinae
Carabidae genera